The Karis railway station is a railway station in the town of Raseborg in the Uusimaa region, Finland. The station is located along the track between Helsinki and Turku, about 87 km west from Helsinki Central railway station and serves as a connection point between three different tracks: the main track between Helsinki and Turku, a branch track to the city of Hanko, and a former privately owned track between Karis and Hyvinkää, currently largely disused. 

Nearly all long-distance trains between Helsinki and Turku stop at the Karis railway station. The station is also the northern terminus of Karis-Hanko regional trains (railbuses) and used to be the westernmost terminus of Helsinki commuter rail (Y-line) in 2002–2016, although the station was served by one Y-line commuter train service to Helsinki at 5.44 in the morning (HL 8570) and an L-line service from Helsinki arriving at 0.39 ik the morning (HL 8525) until the municipality stopped purcjsong them from HSL in June 2021, resulting in their withdrawal. The station also serves cargo traffic.

There are also three bus departures from the Karis railway station to Kirkkonummi, via Ingå on weekdays (Mon-Fri).

History 
The Karis railway station was founded to serve a privately owned track between Hanko and Hyvinkää, and taken into use in 1873. After a few years, the privately owned track had only made a loss, and the station was transferred over to the Finnish state.

The station became a crossing point in 1899, when the track between Karis and Turku was opened. The track between Karis and Pasila was opened in 1903.

Departure tracks 
There are four platform tracks at the Karis railway station used by the passenger trains.

 Track 1 is the departure track for Karis-Hanko regional trains.
 Track 2 is the departure track for eastbound long-distance services, towards Helsinki.
 Track 3 is the departure track for westbound long-distance services, towards Turku.
 Track 4 was the departure track for Y-line commuter train to Helsinki at 5:43. Nowadays this track is unused by passenger trains.

See also 
 Railway lines in Finland

References 

Railway stations in Uusimaa
Raseborg
Railway stations opened in 1873